Porterville Unified School District (PUSD) is a school district located in Porterville, Tulare County, California, and is composed of ten elementary schools, three middle schools, four comprehensive high schools, a continuation school, large adult school, and three alternative program sites. The high schools are accredited and provide academic programs that prepare students for university entrance. Other programs include music, art, agriculture, athletics, and vocational preparation.

History 
In 1896 Porterville High School was set up in the east room of the second story of the Morton Street Elementary School. The school was financially supported with tuition from students coming from outside the Porterville School area. Porterville High School was renamed to Porterville Union High School in 1910. In 1924 Porterville Elementary District was consolidated, adding Worth Elementary School. Vandalia Elementary School joined the Porterville Elementary District in 1925. Miles Elementary School was added to the Porterville Elementary District in 1932. On June 15, 1928 a two-classroom addition was added to the Porterville Union High School for use as a junior college. The addition of a junior College did not change the extent of the district but admitted junior college students from Strathmore, Lindsay, Exeter, and Tulare high schools. This was paid for by the county, and the overhead costs for the students were chargeable to the districts.

In 1998 Porterville Unified School District was created by unifying the Porterville Elementary District (est.1862) and Porterville Union High School (est.1869). Strathmore High School District was merged into the Porterville Unified School District in 2004.

Schools

Elementary schools
Belleview Elementary School*
John J. Doyle Elementary School
Los Robles Elementary School
Monte Vista Elementary School
Olive Street Elementary School
Roche Avenue Elementary School
Santa Fe Elementary School
Vandalia Elementary School
Westfield Elementary School
West Putnam Elementary School

Middle schools
Barlett Middle School
Pioneer Middle School
Sequoia Middle School

Comprehensive high schools
Granite Hills High School
Monache High School
Porterville High School
Strathmore High School

Continuation schools
Citrus High School

Alternative program sites
Harmony Magnet Academy
Prospect Education Center
Vine Street Community Day School
Butterfield Charter High School

Large adult schools
Porterville Adult School

References

External links

School districts in Tulare County, California
Porterville, California
1998 establishments in California
School districts established in 1998